This table compares tanks in use by the belligerent nations of Europe and the Pacific at the start of the Second World War, employed in the Polish Campaign (1939), the Battle of France (1940), Operation Barbarossa (1941), and the Malayan Campaign (1942).

Notes

References 

History of the tank
Tanks